Weirdos is a 2016 Canadian drama film directed by Bruce McDonald and written by Daniel MacIvor. It debuted at the 2016 Toronto International Film Festival.

Set in Nova Scotia in 1976, it stars Dylan Authors as Kit, a teenager living in Antigonish who decides to run away to live with his mother in Sydney.

Plot
Kit (Dylan Authors) is a 15-year-old living in a small town in Nova Scotia with his single father Dave (Allan Hawco) and grandmother Mary (Cathy Jones). He is dating Alice (Julia Sarah Stone) despite being unsure of his own sexuality. Deciding that he wants to go live with his mother Laura (Molly Parker) in Sydney, he enlists Alice's help to embark on a hitchhiking trip. Throughout the trip, Kit has regular imaginary conversations with Andy Warhol (Rhys Bevan-John), who has appointed himself Kit's "spirit animal".

Cast
List based on IMDb.

Production
The film was shot in colour and later converted to black and white. McDonald said, "It's always difficult to shoot black and white because the powers that be, or the funders, are often wanting colour because colour is a bit more normal. (But) in the independent world, sometimes it does offer you those other kind of freedoms like, 'Let's go black and white!' And it's not for everybody, but a lot of people are like, 'Wow, that's just so beautiful in black and white.'"

The film's soundtrack includes a predominantly Canadian lineup of rock and pop songs from the era, including Harry Nilsson's "I Guess the Lord Must Be in New York City", Lighthouse's "Love of a Woman", Gordon Lightfoot's "Summer Side of Life" and "Cotton Jenny", Rush's "Finding My Way", Edward Bear's "Last Song", The Stampeders' "Carry Me", Crowbar's "Oh, What a Feeling", FM's "Phasers on Stun", Patsy Gallant's "From New York to L.A.", Labi Siffre's "Crying Laughing Loving Lying", Murray McLauchlan's "Down by the Henry Moore" and Anne Murray's "Snowbird".

Reception

Critical response
On review aggregator website Rotten Tomatoes, the film holds an approval rating of 93%, based on 14 reviews, and an average rating of 6.9/10.

Adam Nayman of Cinema Scope stated, "It's nice that this latest work by a filmmaker who has sometimes chased hipness past its expiration date concludes on a note of deliberate, intergenerational non-cool." Brent Mcknight of The Seattle Times remarked, "The young leads are charming and authentic, and the film reminds us all to embrace our own weirdness." The Toronto Stars Peter Howell said that "Weirdos is one of Bruce McDonald's sweetest films." The Hollywood Reporters Sheri Linden called the film "A lovely, low-key memory piece, vibrant with the awkward grace of adolescence."

Awards and nominations

References

External links
 
 

2016 films
2010s drama road movies
Canadian drama road movies
Films directed by Bruce McDonald
Canadian LGBT-related films
2016 LGBT-related films
LGBT-related drama films
Films set in Nova Scotia
Films shot in Nova Scotia
Films set in 1976
Canadian black-and-white films
Canadian independent films
2016 drama films
LGBT-related coming-of-age films
Canadian coming-of-age drama films
English-language Canadian films
2010s English-language films
2010s Canadian films